William A. Elliott is an American art director. He was nominated for an Academy Award in the category Best Art Direction for the film The Untouchables.

Selected filmography
 The Untouchables (1987)

References

External links

Year of birth missing (living people)
Living people
American art directors